Crimes of War: What the Public Should Know is a 1999 reference book edited by Roy Gutman and David Rieff. The 352-page book contains more than 150 entries, and was published by W.W. Norton.

The book collects reporters' accounts of war crimes with essays by lawyers on international humanitarian law to examine war crimes and the laws of war. Contributors include Sydney Schanberg, William Shawcross, Christiane Amanpour, and Justice Richard Goldstone, the UN Tribunal's first prosecutor, who provides a foreword. Photographers featured include Gilles Peress and Annie Leibovitz. 

The book is part of a comprehensive project started by Gutman which includes educational initiatives and additional articles. It has been published in 11 languages, including Arabic, Spanish, Italian, Hungarian, Serbo-Croatian and Chinese. A revised edition (2.0) with updated articles was published in October 2007 by W.W. Norton.

Reviews
"Crimes of War is fascinating and quite probably indispensable for anyone whose job it is to cover conflicts." --The Evening Standard
"A riveting mixture of reporters' accounts of war crimes in every continent, coupled with essays by lawyers on international humanitarian law." --The Guardian

Detailed release information
Crimes of War: What the Public Should Know, Gutman, Roy, and David Rieff. W. W. Norton & Company, New York City: 1999,   (Pbk.)

References

External links
 Crimes of War Project
 Crimes of War - Educator's Guide
 Crimes of War Google eBooks

1999 non-fiction books
Political books
W. W. Norton & Company books